Geostiba is a genus of beetles belonging to the family Staphylinidae.

The species of this genus are found in Europe, Australia and Northern America.

Species:

 Geostiba acifera Assing, 1999
 Geostiba aculeata (Coiffait, 1968)
Geostiba ahaiaensis Assing, 1999 
Geostiba albacetensis Pace, 1983 
Geostiba alexandri Pace, 1977 
Geostiba amplicollis Pace, 1988 
Geostiba andalusa Pace, 2002 
Geostiba angelinii Pace, 2002 
Geostiba anxanensis Pace, 1977 
Geostiba apfelbecki Eppelsheim, 1892 
Geostiba appuana (Bernhauer, 1940) 
Geostiba araneaensis Pace, 1990 
Geostiba arazeccana (Bernhauer, 1909) 
Geostiba arida (Eppelsheim, 1881) 
Geostiba arieiroensis Assing & Wunderle, 1996 
Geostiba armata (Eppelsheim, 1878) 
Geostiba armicollis (Breit, 1917) 
Geostiba arundensis Pace, 1990 
Geostiba aspromontana Pace, 1977 
Geostiba asturiensis (Fagel, 1967) 
Geostiba australiae (Cameron, 1943) 
Geostiba baetica Pace, 1983 
Geostiba barcinonensis Pace, 1983 
Geostiba behnei Zerche, 2002 
Geostiba beieri (Scheerpeltz, 1959) 
Geostiba belasizaensis Zerche, 2002 
Geostiba bermejensis Pace, 2002 
Geostiba bernhaueri (Breit, 1912) 
Geostiba beroni (Coiffait, 1968) 
Geostiba besila Pace, 1996 
Geostiba besucheti (Fagel, 1961) 
Geostiba bicacanaensis Assing & Wunderle, 1996 
Geostiba bidens (Baudi, 1869) 
Geostiba biharica Pace, 1990 
Geostiba biokovensis Pace, 1990 
Geostiba brancomontis Assing & Wunderle, 1996 
Geostiba breviuter Assing, 2000 
Geostiba brigantii Pace, 1988 
Geostiba bulbifera Zerche, 1988 
Geostiba bulgarica Pace, 1983 
Geostiba cabrerensis Assing, 2003 
Geostiba calabra Pace, 1974 
Geostiba caligicola Assing & Wunderle, 1996 
Geostiba calva Pace, 1977 
Geostiba carinthiaca (Scheerpeltz, 1957) 
Geostiba cassagnaui (Coiffait, 1968) 
Geostiba catalanica (Scheerpeltz, 1961) 
Geostiba cavipennis (Mulsant & Rey, 1875) 
Geostiba cazorlensis (Fagel, 1961) 
Geostiba cerrutii Pace, 1977 
Geostiba chlorotica (Fairmaire, 1859) 
Geostiba circaea Pace, 1977 
Geostiba cirocchii Pace, 2002 
Geostiba coiffaiti Pace, 1983 
Geostiba coiffaitiana Pace, 1990 
Geostiba comellinii Pace, 1983 
Geostiba commingensis Pace, 1990 
Geostiba conifera Fauvel, 1900 
Geostiba consobrina Assing, 2003 
Geostiba cosentina Pace, 1977 
Geostiba couflesensis Pace, 1990 
Geostiba covadongensis (Fagel, 1967) 
Geostiba cribripennis Pace, 1990 
Geostiba croatica (Eppelsheim, 1880) 
Geostiba cryptophthalma (Scheerpeltz, 1951) 
Geostiba curtipennis (Aubé, 1863) 
Geostiba curzolae (Bernhauer, 1931) 
Geostiba cyprensis Pace, 1993 
Geostiba deubeli (Bernhauer, 1909) 
Geostiba diversiventris (Bernhauer, 1909) 
Geostiba doderoana (Roubal, 1912) 
Geostiba douradasensis Pace, 1983 
Geostiba ehlersi (Eppelsheim, 1884) 
Geostiba endogea Assing & Wunderle, 1996 
Geostiba ensifera (Ganglbauer, 1895) 
Geostiba ericicola Assing, 1997 
Geostiba euboica Pace, 1990 
Geostiba excaecata Assing, 2001 
Geostiba exsecta Assing, 1999 
Geostiba falakroensis Assing, 1999 
Geostiba feldmanni Assing, 2003 
Geostiba filiformis (Wollaston, 1854) 
Geostiba flava (Kraatz, 1856) 
Geostiba florentina Pace, 1977 
Geostiba focarilei (Scheerpeltz, 1956) 
Geostiba formicarum (Wollaston, 1854) 
Geostiba fretoria (Fagel, 1961) 
Geostiba fthiotisensis Assing, 1999 
Geostiba furcifera Fauvel, 1900 
Geostiba fuscula (Ganglbauer, 1895) 
Geostiba gadesensis Pace, 1990 
Geostiba gaditana (Fagel, 1961) 
Geostiba galicicana Assing, 2000 
Geostiba gardensis Pace, 1990 
Geostiba gardinii Pace, 1988 
Geostiba garganica Pace, 2002 
Geostiba gerundensis Pace, 2002 
Geostiba glacialis (Brisout, 1967)
Geostiba graminicola Assing & Wunderle, 1996 
Geostiba granollersensis Pace, 2002 
Geostiba gyorffyi (Bernhauer, 1929) 
Geostiba hachoensis Assing, 2003 
Geostiba heraultensis Pace, 1990 
Geostiba hernica Pace, 1977 
Geostiba hervei Pace, 1990 
Geostiba hickeri (Scheerpeltz, 1963) 
Geostiba hispalensis Pace, 1990 
Geostiba hummleri (Bernhauer, 1931) 
Geostiba icaria Pace, 1996 
Geostiba idaea Pace, 1996 
Geostiba ilievi Zerche, 2002 
Geostiba impressa (Mulsant & Rey, 1875) 
Geostiba incisa (Peyerimhoff, 1900) 
Geostiba infirma (Weise, 1878) 
Geostiba insularis (Bernhauer, 1909) 
Geostiba ionica Pace, 1977 
Geostiba italica Pace, 1988 
Geostiba itiensis Assing, 1999 
Geostiba jarasteparensis Pace, 2002 
Geostiba josephi Pace, 1977 
Geostiba kasyi (Scheerpeltz, 1959) 
Geostiba killiniensis Assing, 1999 
Geostiba korbi (Eppelsheim, 1889) 
Geostiba krapinensis Pace, 1990 
Geostiba laevata (Mulsant & Rey, 1875) 
Geostiba laevigata (Brisout, 1866) 
Geostiba lagrecai Pace, 1979 
Geostiba lanzarotensis (Palm, 1975) 
Geostiba lapurdensis Pace, 1990 
Geostiba laticornis (Fauvel, 1890) 
Geostiba lauricola Assing & Wunderle, 1996 
Geostiba lavagnei Peyerimhoff, 1917 
Geostiba leonhardi (Bernhauer, 1908) 
Geostiba lepinensis Pace, 1977 
Geostiba leridensis Pace, 1990 
Geostiba leucadiae (Scheerpeltz, 1931) 
Geostiba ligurica Pace, 1988 
Geostiba lindrothi Franz, 1981 
Geostiba linearis (Brisout, 1867) 
Geostiba linkei (Bernhauer, 1940) 
Geostiba lonai (Scheerpeltz, 1957) 
Geostiba longicollis Fauvel, 1900 
Geostiba lozerensis Pace, 1990 
Geostiba lucana Pace, 2002 
Geostiba lucens (Benick, 1970) 
Geostiba luigionii Bernhauer, 1899 
Geostiba maderi Pace, 1996 
Geostiba magistrettii (Scheerpeltz, 1958) 
Geostiba magrinii Pace, 1996 
Geostiba maritima Pace, 1990 
Geostiba maroneiensis Pace, 1979 
Geostiba matajurensis (Scheerpeltz, 1957) 
Geostiba matsakisi (Coiffait, 1968) 
Geostiba meixneri (Bernhauer, 1910)
 Geostiba melanocephala (Crotch, 1876)
 Geostiba melitensis Pace, 1999
 Geostiba menalonensis Assing, 1999
 Geostiba mendax Pace, 1977
 Geostiba menikioensis Assing, 1999
 Geostiba menozzii Pace, 1988
 Geostiba meschniggi Pace, 1996
 Geostiba meschniggiana (Bernhauer, 1936)
 Geostiba meybohmi Assing, 2000
 Geostiba mihoki (Bernhauer, 1931)
 Geostiba moczarskii (Scheerpeltz, 1951)
 Geostiba molitgensis Pace, 2002
 Geostiba monogranulata Pace, 1990
 Geostiba montivaga (Brisout, 1863)
 Geostiba moreli (Bernhauer, 1898)
Geostiba mostarensis Pace, 2002 
Geostiba muscicola (Wollaston, 1864) 
Geostiba myops (Kiesenwetter, 1850) 
Geostiba nebrodensis Pace, 1979 
Geostiba nitida (Fauvel, 1871) 
Geostiba nivicola (Fairmaire & Laboulbène, 1854) 
Geostiba noctis Assing, 1997 
Geostiba numantensis Pace, 1983 
Geostiba obtusicollis Assing, 2000 
Geostiba occulta Assing & Wunderle, 1996 
Geostiba oertzeni (Eppelsheim, 1888) 
Geostiba optima Pace, 1983 
Geostiba orhyensis Pace, 1990 
Geostiba osellai Pace, 1977 
Geostiba ossalensis Pace, 1990 
Geostiba ossogovskaensis Zerche, 2002 
Geostiba othrisensis Assing, 2001 
Geostiba pacei Zerche, 1988 
Geostiba padana (Weise, 1878) 
Geostiba paganettiana (Bernhauer, 1936) 
Geostiba pandellei (Brisout, 1867) 
Geostiba pangeoensis Assing, 1999 
Geostiba panormitana Pace, 1979 
Geostiba paracoiffaitiana Pace, 1990 
Geostiba parnoniensis Assing, 1999 
Geostiba pauli Assing, 1999
 Geostiba picena Pace, 1977
 Geostiba plicatella (Fauvel, 1878)
 Geostiba pluricarinata Pace, 2002
 Geostiba poggii Pace, 1988
 Geostiba portosantoi Franz, 1981
 Geostiba portuscomtensis Tronquet, 2000
 Geostiba pulchella (Baudi, 1869)
 Geostiba quadrisignata Pace, 1990
 Geostiba revelieri (Mulsant & Rey, 1875)
 Geostiba rhilensis (Rambousek, 1924)
 Geostiba rhodiensis Pace, 1993
 Geostiba rhunensis Fauvel, 1900
 Geostiba rodopensis Pace, 1990
 Geostiba romana (Bernhauer, 1909)
 Geostiba rossii Pace, 1977
 Geostiba rugosipennis (Scriba, 1867)
 Geostiba ruivomontis Assing & Wunderle, 1996
 Geostiba sacra Pace, 1977
 Geostiba salatensis Pace, 1990
 Geostiba samai Pace, 1977
 Geostiba samnitica Pace, 1977
 Geostiba sardoa Pace, 1988
 Geostiba schneideri (Bernhauer, 1940)
 Geostiba schuelkei Assing, 1999
 Geostiba sculpticollis (Apfelbeck, 1907)
 Geostiba segurensis Pace, 1990
 Geostiba sibyllinica Pace, 2002
 Geostiba siciliana Pace, 1979
 Geostiba siculifera Assing, 1999
 Geostiba simbruinica Pace, 1977
 Geostiba skalitzkyi (Oliveira, 1893)
 Geostiba slaviankaensis Zerche, 2002
 Geostiba solarii (Bernhauer, 1902)
 Geostiba solifuga (Ganglbauer, 1895)
 Geostiba spinicollis (Kraatz, 1862)
 Geostiba spizzana (Bernhauer, 1931)
 Geostiba straneoi (Bernhauer, 1940)
 Geostiba stussineri (Bernhauer, 1914)
 Geostiba subasiensis Pace, 2002
 Geostiba subcarinulata (Bernhauer, 1909)
 Geostiba sublaevis (Mulsant & Rey, 1875)
 Geostiba subterranea Assing & Wunderle, 1996
 Geostiba tamaninii (Scheerpeltz, 1956)
 Geostiba tarifensis Pace, 2002
 Geostiba taygetana (Bernhauer, 1936)
 Geostiba temeris Assing, 1997
 Geostiba tenebrarum Assing, 1997
 Geostiba tenenbaumi (Bernhauer, 1940)
 Geostiba tergestina Pace, 1988
 Geostiba thermarum Fauvel, 1900
 Geostiba thryptisensis Assing, 2001
 Geostiba torisuturalis Assing, 2000
 Geostiba tronqueti Pace, 2002
 Geostiba turcica (Bernhauer, 1900)
 Geostiba turrensis Pace, 1990
 Geostiba tyrrhenica Pace, 1977
 Geostiba ulcerifera Assing, 1999
 Geostiba unituberculata Assing, 2003
 Geostiba vaccinicola Assing & Wunderle, 1996
 Geostiba valentiana Pace, 1990
 Geostiba vallierensis Pace, 1990
 Geostiba varensis Pace, 2002
 Geostiba vascona Pace, 1996
 Geostiba veneta Pace, 1977
 Geostiba ventosa Pace, 1996
 Geostiba vermionensis Assing, 1999
 Geostiba vidua Pace, 1983
 Geostiba vivesi (Coiffait, 1976)
 Geostiba weiratheri Pace, 1984
 Geostiba winkleriana Pace, 1996
 Geostiba wunderlei Pace, 1996
 Geostiba xerovuniana (Scheerpeltz, 1959)
 Geostiba zeithammeri (Bernhauer, 1940)
 Geostiba zercheana Assing, 1999
 Geostiba zoufali (Rambousek, 1915)

References

Staphylinidae
Staphylinidae genera